The following lists events that happened during 2021 in New Zealand.

Incumbents

Regal and vice-regal
 Head of State – Elizabeth II
 Governor-General – Patsy Reddy until 28 September, and then Cindy Kiro from 21 October

Government

Legislature term: 53rd New Zealand Parliament

The Sixth Labour Government, elected in 2020, continues.

 Speaker of the House – Trevor Mallard
 Prime Minister – Jacinda Ardern
 Deputy Prime Minister – Grant Robertson
 Leader of the House – Chris Hipkins
 Minister of Finance – Grant Robertson
 Minister of Foreign Affairs – Nanaia Mahuta

Other party leaders in parliament
 National – Judith Collins until 25 November, then Christopher Luxon from 30 November (leader of the Opposition)
 Green  –  James Shaw and Marama Davidson
 ACT – David Seymour
 Māori Party – Rawiri Waititi and Debbie Ngarewa-Packer

Judiciary
Chief Justice – Helen Winkelmann

Main centre leaders
Mayor of Auckland – Phil Goff
Mayor of Tauranga – Tina Salisbury (acting), then Anne Tolley (as chair of commissioners) from 9 February
Mayor of Hamilton – Paula Southgate
Mayor of Wellington – Andy Foster
Mayor of Christchurch – Lianne Dalziel
Mayor of Dunedin – Aaron Hawkins

Events

January 
 29 December 2020 to 3 January – Riots between inmates and prison guards at Waikeria Prison, causing major fire damage to the complex.
 1 January – A bomb threat closes Gisborne Airport, causing evacuations and delayed flights.

February 
2 February – Lead is found in water of two Otago towns, Waikouaiti and Karitāne.
9 February – Māori Party co-leader and Member of Parliament Rawiri Waititi is not allowed to speak because he was wearing a traditional pendant rather than a tie.
 15 February – COVID-19 in New Zealand: Auckland moves to Alert Level 3, while the rest of New Zealand moves to Alert Level 2.
 17 February – COVID-19 in New Zealand: Auckland moves to Alert Level 2 from midnight while the rest of New Zealand reverts to Alert Level 1 from midnight.
 21 February – COVID-19 in New Zealand: Auckland moves to Alert Level 1 at midnight.
 27 February – COVID-19 in New Zealand: Auckland moves back into an Alert Level 3 lockdown for the next seven days while the rest of New Zealand moves back to an Alert Level 2.

March 
 5 March
 A tsunami warning is issued following a 7.1M at 2.27am near East Cape and Gisborne.
 A 7.4M at 6.40am hits the Kermadec Islands.
 A tsunami threat and warning is issued for New Zealand after a 8.1M earthquake in the Kermadec Islands. The Beehive Bunker has been activated. Tsunami land threat was dropped at 1.20pm by GNS to a beach and marine threat. The national tsunami advisory was later dropped at 3.43pm.
 COVID-19 in New Zealand: Jacinda Ardern announces that Auckland will move to Alert Level 2 lockdown from Alert Level 3, with the rest of New Zealand moving down to Alert Level 1, at 6am, on 7 March. The Ardern ministry will review the alert level of Auckland at the start of the weekend following the alert downgrade.
7 March – COVID-19 in New Zealand: Auckland moves to Alert Level 2, with the rest of New Zealand moving to Alert Level 1.
12 March – COVID-19 in New Zealand: Auckland moves to Alert Level 1 at midday.

April 
 19 April – COVID-19 in New Zealand: Quarantine-free travel with Australia begins.

May 
 10 May – Four people are injured during a stabbing attack at a Countdown supermarket in central Dunedin
 17 May – COVID-19 in New Zealand: Quarantine-free travel with the Cook Islands begins.
 20 May – The 2021 Budget is delivered.
24 May – Dame Cindy Kiro is announced as the next Governor-General.
30 May – A state of emergency is announced in Ashburton, Selwyn and Timaru districts as torrential rain hits the Canterbury region.

June 
 7 June – The 2021 Queen's Birthday Honours are announced.
 19 June – A tornado hit the southern Auckland suburb of Papatoetoe, killing one man and injuring two others.
22 June – COVID-19 in New Zealand: New Zealand pauses the travel bubble with New South Wales as cases of COVID-19 surge in Sydney.
23 June – COVID-19 in New Zealand: The Wellington Region moves to Alert Level 2, following a positive case of the delta variant who flew to Wellington from Sydney. No outbreak occurred.

July 
 2 July – The government releases the dates of the Matariki public holiday for the next thirty years.
23 July – New Zealand athletes begin competing at the 2020 Summer Olympics.

August 
 8 August – New Zealand athletes finish competing at the 2020 Summer Olympics.
 17 August – COVID-19 in New Zealand: New Zealand enters Alert Level 4, following a positive case of the Delta Variant of COVID-19 in Auckland. 
 24 August to 5 September 2021 – Athletes compete at the 2020 Summer Paralympics.

September 
 1 September - COVID-19 in New Zealand: New Zealand except for Auckland and Northland moved to Alert Level 3. 3 September – Seven people are injured during a stabbing attack at a Countdown supermarket in LynnMall, West Auckland. The attacker was shot and killed by police.
 14 September – The Māori Party launch a petition to rename the official name of the nation to Aotearoa and restore Māori placenames by 2026. 

 October 
 21 October
 Dame Cindy Kiro is sworn in as the 22nd Governor-General of New Zealand.
 Prime Minister Ardern announces an agreement on a New Zealand–United Kingdom Free Trade Agreement, promising zero-tariffs and a $970m economic boost.

 November 
25 November – Judith Collins loses a confidence vote as leader of the National Party after her handling over a historic allegation regarding Simon Bridges. Shane Reti becomes interim leader.
 30 November – Christopher Luxon is elected leader of the National Party.

 December 
 2 December - COVID-19 in New Zealand: The alert level system is dropped in favour of the new traffic light system at 11:59 pm. Northland, Auckland, Taupō, Rotorua, Kawerau, Whakatane, Ōpōtiki, Gisborne, Wairoa, Whanganui and Ruapehu regions initially moved to ‘Red’ while the rest of the country was moved into ‘Orange.’
 16 December – The 2021 New Zealand bravery awards are announced.
 31 December – The 2022 New Year Honours are announced.

 Holidays and observances 
Public holidays in New Zealand in 2021 are as follows:

 1 January – New Year's Day
 2 January – Day after New Year's Day
 4 January – Day after New Year's Day observed
 6 February – Waitangi Day
 8 February – Waitangi Day observed
 2 April – Good Friday
 5 April – Easter Monday
 25 April – Anzac Day
 26 April – Anzac Day observed
 7 June – Queen's Birthday
 25 October – Labour Day
 25 December – Christmas Day
 26 December – Boxing Day
 27 December – Christmas Day observed
 28 December – Boxing Day observed

Sports

Olympics

 New Zealand sends a team of 225 competitors across 21 sports.
{| class="wikitable"
|-
!  !!  !!  !! Total
|- style="text-align:center;"
| 7 || 6 || 7 || 20
|}

 Paralympics 

{| class="wikitable"
|-
!  !!  !!  !! Total
|- style="text-align:center;"
| 6 || 3 || 3 || 12
|}

Rowing
New Zealand Secondary School Championships (Maadi Cup)
 Maadi Cup (boys' U18 coxed eight) – Christ's College
 Levin Jubilee Cup (girls' U18 coxed eight) – Rangi Ruru Girls' School
 Star Trophy (overall points) – Rangi Ruru Girls' School

Shooting
Ballinger Belt – Mike Collings (Te Puke)

Deaths

 January 
 6 January – Alan Burgess, cricketer (Canterbury), world's oldest living first-class cricketer (since 2020) (born 1920).
 8 January – Stewart McKnight, cricketer (Otago) and curler (born 1935).
 12 January – John Ward, cricketer (Canterbury, national team) (born 1937).
 17 January – Tom Prebble, educationalist and university administrator (Massey University) (born 1945).
 18 January – Ash Gardiner, rugby union player (Taranaki, national team) (born 1946).
 20 January
 Doug Bowden, cricketer (Central Districts) (born 1927).
 Bill Sheat, lawyer and arts advocate (born 1930).
 26 January
 Ben Te Haara, Māori Anglican priest, Bishop of Te Tai Tokerau (1992–2001) ((born 1932).
 Peter Thorburn, rugby union player (Auckland) and coach (North Harbour, national sevens team, United States national team) (born 1939).
 Peter Vere-Jones, actor (Pukemanu, Shortland Street, The Hobbit: The Desolation of Smaug) (born 1939).
 30 January – Bill Hammond, artist (born 1947).

 February 
 3 February – Peter Nicholls, sculptor (Toroa) (born 1936).
 4 February – Solomon Faine, microbiologist (Monash University) (born 1926).
 6 February – Bruce Taylor, cricketer (Canterbury, Wellington, national team) (born 1943).
 22 February – Peter Rattray, cricketer (Canterbury) (born 1958).

March
 3 March – Jonathan Temm, lawyer, president of the New Zealand Law Society (2010–2013), Queen's Counsel (since 2019) (born 1962).
 5 March – Francis Small, civil engineer and scouting leader, managing director of New Zealand Rail / Tranz Rail (1972–2000), president of IPENZ (1996–1997),  Bronze Wolf Award (1999) (born 1946).
 12 March – Avenal McKinnon, art historian and writer, director of the New Zealand Portrait Gallery (2005–2014) (born 1949).
 15 March – Miriama Rauhihi Ness, Māori activist (Ngā Tamatoa, Polynesian Panthers) and social worker (born 1951).
 18 March – David Braithwaite, property developer and local politician, Mayor of Hamilton (2001–2004) (born 1937).

April
 3 April – John Edgar, sculptor and medallist (born 1950).
 8 April – John da Silva, Olympic (1956) and British Empire and Commonwealth Games (1958) wrestler, boxer and youth worker (born 1934).
 15 April – Leon van den Eijkel, artist (born 1940).
 17 April – John Ogilvie, cricketer (Wellington) (born 1931).
 18 April
 Mary Earle, food technologist (Massey University) (born 1929).
 Iain Gallaway, cricketer (Otago), rugby union referee, lawyer and sports commentator, president of New Zealand Cricket (1997–2000), chair of the Broadcasting Standards Authority (1989–1995) (born 1922).
 19 April – Mike Dormer, cricketer (Auckland) (born 1937).
 27 April – Dave Cull, television presenter (Home Front), writer, and local politician, mayor of Dunedin (2010–2019) (born 1950).

May
 3 May – Steve McKean, basketball coach (national team) (born ).
 4 May – Margaret Forsyth, world champion netball player (1979, 1987), netball coach (Waikato Bay of Plenty Magic) and local politician, Hamilton city councillor (2010–2016, since 2019) (born 1961).
 8 May
 George Skudder, rugby union player (Waikato, New Zealand Māori, national team) (born 1948).
 Rana Waitai, politician, MP for Te Puku O Te Whenua (1996–1999) (born 1942).
 10 May – Jenny King, librarian (University of Waikato) (born 1929).
 14 May – David McPhail, comedian (A Week of It), actor (Letter to Blanchy, Seven Periods with Mr Gormsby) and writer (Letter to Blanchy) (born 1945).
 15 May – Emily Mair, opera singer, pianist, and vocal coach (Victoria University of Wellington) (born 1928).
 17 May
 Nan Kinross, nurse and nursing academic (Massey University) (born 1926).
 Janet Shackleton, hurdler, British Empire Games bronze medallist (1950) (born 1928).
 21 May – Merv Norrish, diplomat and public servant, ambassador to the United States (1978–1980), secretary of foreign affairs (1980–1988) (born 1926).
 23 May – Ross Taylor, geochemist and planetary scientist (Australian National University) (born 1925).

June
 1 June – Ian Shearer, politician, MP for Hamilton East (1975–1984), Minister for the Environment (1981–1984), Minister of Science and Technology (1981–1984), Minister of Broadcasting (1981–1984) (born 1941).
 2 June
 Vonnie Cave, photographer, camellia grower and gardening writer (born 1928).
 Les Rackley, boxing trainer (Jeff Rackley, Les Rackley) (born 1929).
 4 June – Tilly Hirst, world champion netball player (1967) (born 1941).
 7 June – Richard Nunns, Hall of Fame traditional Māori instrumental musician (born 1945).
 9 June – Steve Mrkusic, architect (born 1928).
 11 June
 Dame Georgina Kirby, Māori leader and women's advocate, president of the Māori Women's Welfare League (1983–1987) (born 1936).
 Ron Sang, architect (Brian Brake House), art collector (born 1938).
 12 June – Robert Edgcumbe, 8th Earl of Mount Edgcumbe, peer (born 1939).
 14 June
 Sir Eion Edgar, Hall of Fame businessman and philanthropist (Edgar Centre), chancellor of the University of Otago (1999–2003), Senior New Zealander of the Year (2010) (born 1945).
 Sir Ian Hassall, paediatrician and children's advocate, Children's Commissioner (1989–1994) (born 1941).
 16 June – John Osmers, Anglican priest and anti-apartheid activist, Bishop of Eastern Zambia (1995–2002) (born 1935).
 17 June – Fane Flaws, musician (Blerta, The Spats, The Crocodiles), songwriter and artist (born 1951).
 19 June – Colin Loader, rugby union player (Wellington, national team) (born 1931).
 24 June – Tom Flaws, cricketer (Otago) (born 1932).
 25 June – John Sigley, cricketer (Wellington) (born 1931).

July
 5 July – Vivienne Cassie Cooper, planktologist and botanist (DSIR) (born 1926).
 6 July – Mary Fama, applied mathematician (DSIR, CSIRO) (born 1938).
 9 July
 Betty Gilderdale, children's author, Margaret Mahy Award (1994), Children's Literature Association Award for Services to Children's Literature (1999) (born 1923).
 Ngaire Lane, Olympic swimmer (1948) (born 1925).
 11 July – George Petersen, biochemist (University of Otago), Fellow of the Royal Society of New Zealand (since 1985), Rutherford Medal (2003) (born 1933).
 15 July – Bruce Watt, rugby union player (Wanganui, Canterbury, national team) and coach (born 1939).
 17 July – Jonathan White, landscape artist and conservationist (born 1938).
 18 July – Philip Sherry, newsreader (NZBC and TV One Network News, Morning Report, 3 National News) and local politician, Auckland Regional Councillor (1995–2004), Bay of Plenty Regional Councillor (2004–2016) (born 1933).
 19 July – Paratene Matchitt, artist (City to Sea Bridge) (born 1933).
 28 July – Malcolm McCaw, cricketer (Wellington) and accountant (born 1930).

August
 1 August – Kihi Ngatai, Māori leader (Ngāi Te Rangi) and horticulturalist, member of the Waitangi Tribunal (2008–2015) (born 1930).
 3 August – Brian Maunsell, Olympic boxer (1964) (born 1937).
 4 August – Graham McRae, motor racing driving, SCCA L&M Continental 5000 Championship winner (1972), Indianapolis 500 Rookie of the Year (1973) (born 1940).
 5 August
 Brian Henderson, Hall of Fame television and radio broadcaster (Nine News, Bandstand), Gold Logie Award (1968) (born 1931).
 Murray Rose, politician, MP for Otago Central (1969–1972) (born 1939).
 7 August – Mark Weedon, rugby union player (Bay of Plenty, North Harbour, Crusaders) (born 1968).
 8 August – Perry Harris, rugby union player (Manawatu, national team) (born 1946).
 9 August – Olivia Podmore, Olympic (2016) and Commonwealth Games (2018) cyclist (born 1997).
 10 August
 Don McKechnie, cricketer (Otago) and cricket umpire (born 1944).
 John Riordan, jockey, Auckland Cup (1960, 1972), W. S. Cox Plate (1963) (born 1936).
 Peter Whittle, mathematician (DSIR, University of Cambridge), John von Neumann Theory Prize (1997), Fellow of the Royal Society (since 1978) (born 1927).
 11 August – Sir David Levene, Hall of Fame businessman and philanthropist (born 1929).
 14 August – Francis Mossman, actor (Shortland Street, Spartacus: Vengeance, The Horizon) (born 1988).
 15 August
 Greg Rowlands, rugby union player (Bay of Plenty, national team) (born 1947).
 Gary Woollard, rugby league player (Wellington, Auckland, national team) (born 1942).
 16 August – Marilynn Webb, artist and educator (Otago Polytechnic), Frances Hodgkins Fellow (1974), Te Tohu mō Te Arikinui Dame Te Atairangikaahu (2018) (born 1937).
 17 August – Tom Larkin, public servant and diplomat, ambassador to Japan (1972–1976) (born 1917).
 18 August – Austin Mitchell, academic (University of Otago, University of Canterbury), broadcaster (Calendar), writer (The Half-Gallon Quarter-Acre Pavlova Paradise) and politician, MP for Great Grimsby (1977–2015) (born 1934).
 19 August
 Sir Michael Cullen, politician, MP (1981–2009), Minister of Social Welfare (1987–1990), Minister of Finance (1999–2008), Deputy Prime Minister (2002–2008) (born 1945).
 Lyn Hartley, local-body politician, Mayor of Kawerau (1986–2001) (born 1941).
 23 August – Gary Tricker, painter and printmaker (born 1938).
 24 August
 Bruce Culpan, rower, British Empire and Commonwealth Games silver medallist (1950, 1954) (born 1930).
 Harry Kent, Olympic track cyclist (1972), British Commonwealth Games gold medallist (1970), world championship silver medallist (1970), Lonsdale Cup (1970) (born 1947).
 25 August – Max Cryer, broadcaster, entertainer and writer, Entertainer of the Year (1973), Benny Award (1977) (born 1935).
 28 August – Joye Evans, radiographer and guiding leader, New Zealand Girl Guides chief commissioner (1983–1988) (born 1929).

September
 1 September
 Noel Dellow, cricketer (Canterbury) (born 1929).
 Alison Gray, writer and social researcher (born 1943).
 4 September
 Martin Thompson, artist (born 1956).
 Lydia Wevers, literary academic (Victoria University of Wellington), editor and critic (born 1950).
 5 September – Viv Stephens, cricket player (Wellington, Central Districts, national team) and administrator (born 1953).
 6 September
 Billy Apple, pop artist, Arts Foundation of New Zealand Icon (since 2018) (born 1935).
 Peter Arnold, cricket player (Canterbury, Northamptonshire) and administrator, president of Northamptonshire County Cricket Club (1996–2000) (born 1926).
 17 September – Angela Ballara, historian, member of the Waitangi Tribunal (2003–2020) (born 1944).
 19 September – Dame Jocelyn Fish, women's rights advocate and local politician, Piako county councillor (1980–1989), president of the National Council of Women (1986–1990) (born 1930).
 23 September
 Taito Phillip Field, politician, MP for Otara (1993–1996) and Māngere (1996–2008), leader of the New Zealand Pacific Party (2008–2010) (born 1952).
 John Mitchell, historian (born 1941).
 24 September – Waka Nathan, rugby union player (Auckland, national team), selector and administrator, Tom French Cup (1962, 1966), president of the Auckland Rugby Union (2003–2004) (born 1940).
 30 September
 Dorothea Brown, librarian (Christchurch City Libraries) (born 1938).
 Jenny Kirk, politician, MP for Birkenhead (1987–1990), North Shore city councillor (1995–2001) (born 1945).

October
 1 October – Earle Wells, Hall of Fame sailor, Olympic champion (1964) (born 1933).
 4 October
 Laurie Davidson, Hall of Fame yacht designer (NZL 32) (born 1926).
 John Hastie, Commonwealth Games sport shooter (1978, 1982) and gunsmith, Ballinger Belt (1982) (born 1938).
 Joy Watson, children's author, Gaelyn Gordon Award (2000) (born 1938).
 5 October – Pam Williams, Hall of Fame businesswoman and philanthropist (born 1933).
 6 October – Sir Noel Anderson, lawyer and judge, president of the Court of Appeal (2004–2006), Supreme Court justice (2006–2008), Queen's Counsel (since 1986) (born 1944).
 8 October
 Jack Manning, architect (Majestic Centre), NZIA Gold Medal (2011) (born 1928).
 Ian Ormond, association footballer (Blockhouse Bay, national team) (born 1949).
 11 October – Barry Mora, operatic baritone (Gelsenkirchen Opera House, Frankfurt Opera House) (born 1940).
 13 October – Ray Cranch, rugby league player (Auckland, national team) and administrator (born 1923).
 18 October
 Fred Goodall, cricket umpire (born 1938).
 Sean Wainui, rugby union player (Taranaki, Chiefs, Māori All Blacks) (born 1995).
 19 October – Bob Graham, rugby union player (Auckland, Junior All Blacks) and coach (Auckland) (born 1936).
 31 October – Dame Catherine Tizard, zoologist (University of Auckland), television personality (Beauty and the Beast), and politician, mayor of Auckland City (1983–1990), governor-general (1990–1996) (born 1931).

November
 13 November
 Michael Corballis, psychologist and cognitive neuroscientist (University of Auckland), Rutherford Medal (2016) (born 1936).
 Jack Kiddey, cricketer (Canterbury) (born 1929).
 Keith Mann, British Empire and Commonwealth Games fencer (1962, 1966), and sports administrator (born 1932).
 15 November – Sir Rod Weir, Hall of Fame stock and station agent and businessman (born 1927).
 16 November – John Luxton, politician, MP for Matamata (1987–1996) and Karapiro (1996–1999), National list MP (1999–2002), Minister of Police (1994–1996), Minister for Land Information (1996–1999) (born 1946).
 23 November – Robert Ellis, artist and professor of fine arts (Elam School of Fine Arts) (born 1929).
 27 November – Jimmy O'Dea, trade unionist and activist (born 1935).

December
 2 December – Lyndsey Leask, Hall of Fame softball administrator (born 1935).
 6 December – Tom Horton, air force pilot and commander (Royal New Zealand Air Force, Royal Air Force) (born 1919).
 9 December
 Brian Aldridge, cricket umpire (born 1940).
 Julie Brougham, Olympic equestrian (2016) (born 1954).
 12 December – Maʻafu Tukuiʻaulahi, Tongan noble, deputy prime minister of Tonga (since 2020) (born 1955).
 24 December – Terry Morrison, rugby union player (Otago, national team) and sprinter (born 1951).
 26 December – George Johnson, artist (born 1926).
 27 December – Keri Hulme, writer (The Bone People''), Booker Prize (1985) (born 1947).
 30 December – Billy Harrison, rugby league player (Wellington, national team) (born 1938).

References

 
Years in New Zealand
Years of the 21st century in New Zealand
2020s in New Zealand